Eruh is a town and seat of Eruh District of Siirt Province of Turkey.

The town is populated by Kurds of the Botikan tribe and had a population of 8,895 in 2021.

Neighborhoods 
Eruh town is divided into the three neighborhoods of Farih, Sarıgül and Dih.

Politics 
In the local elections of March 2019 Cevher Çiftçi was elected mayor. The current District Governor is Ali Erdoĝan.

History 
Eruh was the location of one of two attacks by the Kurdistan Workers' Party (PKK) on the 15 August 1984.

References

Populated places in Siirt Province

Kurdish settlements in Siirt Province